Agneta Lagerfeldt (1919–2013) was a Swedish stage and film actress. She also acted as a voice actress, dubbing foreign films for release in the Swedish market. She was married to the actor and director Willy Peters.

Selected filmography
 Flames in the Dark (1942)
 A Girl for Me (1943)
 Young Blood (1943)
 Som folk är mest (1944)
 Fram för lilla Märta (1945)
 Love Goes Up and Down (1946)
 Brita in the Merchant's House (1946)
 Evening at the Djurgarden (1946)

References

Bibliography
 Paietta, Ann C. Teachers in the Movies: A Filmography of Depictions of Grade School, Preschool and Day Care Educators, 1890s to the Present. McFarland, 2007.

External links

1919 births
2013 deaths
Swedish film actresses
Swedish stage actresses